is a railway station on the Tsugaru Railway Line in the city of Goshogawara, Aomori, Japan, operated by the private railway operator Tsugaru Railway Company.

Lines

Station layout
The station has a single side platform serving bidirectional traffic. The station is unattended.

History
Gonōkōmae Station was opened on April 1, 1974.

Surrounding area
Goshogawara Agricultural High School (after which the station is named)

See also
 List of railway stations in Japan

External links

 

Railway stations in Aomori Prefecture
Tsugaru Railway Line
Goshogawara
Railway stations in Japan opened in 1974